Jan Erik Gustavsen (born 6 February 1946) is a former Norwegian cyclist. He competed in the individual road race at the 1968 Summer Olympics.

References

External links
 

1946 births
Living people
Sportspeople from Kongsvinger
Norwegian male cyclists
Olympic cyclists of Norway
Cyclists at the 1968 Summer Olympics